The following highways are numbered 964:

Canada

United States